Stuart Laidlaw (March 2, 1877 – November 22, 1960) was a Canadian lacrosse player who competed in the 1904 Summer Olympics. He was born in Ontario and died in Vancouver. In 1904 he was member of the Shamrock Lacrosse Team which won the gold medal in the lacrosse tournament.

References

External links

 Hilliard Laidlaw at databaseolympics.com

1877 births
1960 deaths
Canadian lacrosse players
Olympic lacrosse players of Canada
Lacrosse players at the 1904 Summer Olympics
Olympic gold medalists for Canada
Medalists at the 1904 Summer Olympics
Olympic medalists in lacrosse